The Wavell School is a coeducational community secondary school, located in Farnborough in the English county of Hampshire.

The school serves the civilian and military communities of North Camp, Farnborough and Aldershot, and is administered by Hampshire County Council which coordinates the schools admissions. It is named after Archibald Wavell, 1st Earl Wavell, a senior commander in the British Army who went on to become Viceroy and Governor-General of India.

The Wavell school was opened on 23 October 1970 led by Lady Pamela Humphrys, daughter of Archibald Wavell. At the beginning of the 21st-century the school gained specialist Technology College status. The school offers GCSEs and Cambridge Nationals as programmes of study for pupils. The Wavell School also operates The Duke of Edinburgh's Award programme.

References

External links
The Wavell School official website

Secondary schools in Hampshire
Farnborough, Hampshire
Educational institutions established in 1970
1970 establishments in England
Community schools in Hampshire